Mamnoon Maqsoodi is a well known Afghan actor. He made his acting debut with the film De Konday Zoy playing the role of a simple minded villager named Shadgul.

Early life and education
Mamnoon  Maqsoodi was born in 1966 in Kabul, Afghanistan. He completed his primary education in a local school and graduated from Avicenna High School in Kabul. After completing his high school, he went to serve in the military for 3 years and 10 months.

Once he served his term in the military, he was admitted to the Faculty of Arts in Kabul University. Before completing his final year, the war against the communist regime intensified and he had to migrate to Peshawar, Pakistan.

Work life
While in Peshawar, Mamnoon worked for BBC Afghanistan's educational program. After the fall of Taleban, he returned to Kabul, Afghanistan where he is still working for BBC.

References

1966 births
Living people
Afghan male film actors
Pashtun people
21st-century Afghan male actors
20th-century Afghan male actors
Male actors in Pashto cinema